The Man Who Came to Dinner is a 1972 American TV adaptation of the 1939 play The Man Who Came to Dinner by George S. Kaufman and Moss Hart. It was directed by Buzz Kulik for Hallmark Hall of Fame. The film was broadcast on November 29, 1972.

Plot summary

Cast
 Orson Welles as Sheridan Whiteside
 Lee Remick as Maggie Cutler
 Joan Collins as Lorraine Sheldon
 Don Knotts as Dr. Bradley
 Edward Andrews as Ernest W. Stanley
 Kim Braden as June Stanley
 Marty Feldman as Banjo
 Michael Gough as Beverly Carlton
 Peter Haskell as Bert Jefferson
 Tutte Lemkow as Zoltan
 Al Mancini as Westcott
 Marcella Markham as Mrs. Stanley
 George Pravda as Professor Metz
 Anita Sharp-Bolster as Harriet Stanley
 Elisabeth Welch as Sarah
 Mary Wickes as Nurse Preen

Wickes recreated the role she originated on Broadway in 1939 and which she played in the 1942 film version.

Production
Orson Welles had been offered the role of Sheridan Whiteside on Broadway but turned it down because of the time commitment although he always loved the play. Welles later said that declining the stage production was smart "because if you've seen the film you'll know it was awful and there was no way for anybody to be good in it." The play was adapted and updated for the modern day by Sam Denoff and Bill Persky, who turned Whiteside into a TV talk show host.

The story is based in Ohio but was videotaped in Southampton, England to accommodate Welles who did not want to return to the U.S. due to tax difficulties.

Reception
The Los Angeles Times called it "a splendid romp". Variety singled out the performances by Collins, Andrews, Wickes, Gough, Braden, and Knotts, while saying "None of the others in the extensive cast was less than good."

References

External links
 The Man Who Came to Dinner at BFI
 The Man Who Came to Dinner at IMDb

1972 television films
1972 films
American films based on plays
American television films
Hallmark Hall of Fame episodes
Films directed by Buzz Kulik
Films scored by Roy Budd